Michelle Marjorie Gordon  (born 19 November 1964) is a Justice of the High Court of Australia. She was appointed to the High Court in June 2015. Prior to her appointment, she was a Justice of the Federal Court of Australia, to which she was appointed in 2007.

Early life
Gordon was born in Perth, Western Australia in 1964, to George Gordon and Coral Troy, and received her secondary schooling at St Mary's Anglican Girls' School and Presbyterian Ladies' College. She graduated from the University of Western Australia with a Bachelor of Laws (LL.B., B.Juris.).

Career

Legal career
From 1987, Gordon practised as a solicitor in the Western Australian firm Robinson Cox, and in 1992 was a senior associate at Arthur Robinson & Hedderwicks. In 1992, she became a barrister and in 2003, took silk as a Senior Counsel on the Victorian Bar.

Judicial career
Gordon was appointed a judge of the Federal Court of Australia on 20 April 2007. In one judgment, Gordon said that Coles Supermarkets "threatened harm to suppliers if they didn't meet their demands". In 2014, she ruled against ANZ in a class action on credit card fees. ANZ appealed this decision and were successful in overturning her findings at the Full Court of the Federal Court in 2015. The applicant in the class action then appealed to the High Court of Australia, which heard the appeal and handed down the decision after Gordon was appointed to the High Court (though without her sitting on the appeal). A majority of the High Court dismissed the appeal in 2016, ruling in favour of ANZ.

In April 2015, the Abbott Government announced that Justice Gordon would replace her husband, Kenneth Hayne, on the bench of the High Court of Australia upon his compulsory retirement on reaching the age of 70. Justice Gordon was sworn in on 9 June 2015.

References

External links
The Hon Michelle Marjorie GORDON (Federal Court of Australia)

1964 births
Living people
Judges of the Federal Court of Australia
Justices of the High Court of Australia
Companions of the Order of Australia
Australian women judges
Australian Senior Counsel
Australian barristers
Australian solicitors
Academic staff of the University of Melbourne
University of Melbourne women
University of Western Australia alumni
People from Perth, Western Australia
People educated at St Mary's Anglican Girls' School